Chicago, St. Paul, Minneapolis, and Omaha Depot may refer to:

Chicago, St. Paul, Minneapolis, and Omaha Depot (St. James, Minnesota), listed on the National Register of Historic Places in Watonwan County, Minnesota
Chicago, St. Paul, Minneapolis, and Omaha Depot (Westbrook, Minnesota), listed on the National Register of Historic Places in Cottonwood County, Minnesota

See also
Chicago, Milwaukee, St. Paul and Pacific Railroad Depot (disambiguation)